is an 11-volume manga series created by Moyoko Anno. Translated by Shirley Kubo and Leah Ginsberg, the English version was published in paperback by TokyoPop in 2003 and 2004. It was one of Tokyopop's first "Mature" rated series, and was sold in shrink wrap on US store shelves. Happy Mania is a good example of josei manga, a genre of manga aimed at women over 20 that deals more with the adult aspect of being a woman in contemporary Japan.

Plot
Shigeta, a young woman of 24, spends her days working at Tanaka Books and fretting over her love-life; or, more accurately, the lack thereof. The thing is, though, the biggest obstacle between Shigeta and a satisfying relationship seems to be Shigeta herself. When it comes to men, the poor girl has exceedingly poor judgement, exacerbated by her even poorer self-esteem.

Volume 1
Kayoko Shigeta is spotted digging through a love horoscope while working at Tanaka Books. Been convinced that her relationship karma is at its peak, Shigeta develops an immediately crush on a cute guy customer. After getting his number, she calls the guy and immediately sleeps with him. Unfortunately, this guy only wants sex not a girlfriend. Then Shigeta tries to steal the boyfriend of Yuko Tanabe, the new hire at the book store. Being chased out of the bookstore by furious Yuko, Shigeta runs into a car. After being released from the hospital, Fuku, Shigeta's gorgeous roommate, takes her to a club. There, Shigeta falls for the DJ Tokieda. Being self-convinced that Tokieda is in love with her, Shigeta stops showing up for work and eventually loses her job at the bookstore. Even after spotting a naked woman in his bed, Shigeta still believes that she and Toki will get married soon. However, Tokieda prefers free love  so she rejects him.

Volume 2
Kayoko starts a new job at a make-up store. Meanwhile, Fuku plans to move-out and to marry her fiancé Matsu. However, this marriage is called-off when Fuku finds out that Matsu is cheating on her with Yumi. Shigeta's mom drags her to a temple to ask for a boyfriend. There she runs into Sakai, her high-school classmate. However, Sakai turns out to be a stalker. Shigeta has to keep on hiding away from him but Sakai won't leave her alone. She starts to receive take-out food she didn't order and calls from guys who find her number in phone booths. Sakai eventually kidnaps her. Takahashi rescues her from Sakai and confesses his love. Just as Shigeta starts to fall for Takahashi, he goes to the U.S. to study. Shigeta is alone again.

Volume 3
Shigeta doesn't like her long-distance relationship with Takahashi. Fuku is planning to marry a new guy Hideki and never comes home. At a ceramics exhibit, Shigeta is attracted to the handsome potter Goro Kishiwada. To seduce him, she quits the make-up shop to become an apprentice at Kishiwada's studio. At the studio, she finds him having sex with Midori, the daughter of the master. Just as Shigeta is thinking of how to sleep with Kishiwada, Takahashi shows up at her front door. Later, Midori and Kishiwada elope together. However, Kishiwada tells Shigeta that he was actually tricked by Midori who used him to be with another man. Kishiwada eventually leaves for China. At the end, Shigeta is alone again.

Main characters

Kayoko Shigeta The story's main character, Kayoko is an attractive but insecure 24-year-old girl who is quick to fall for potential suitors and even quicker to draw conclusions about those who she perceives as threatening to her love life.

Takahashi a worker at the same bookstore as Kayoko in volume 1, Takahashi is a student at Tokyo University and is in love with Kayoko despite her constant exploits with other men.

Fukunaga (aka Fuku) is Shigeta's roommate and best friend. Fuku is a slightly older and significantly more grounded female character in the story whose relative success with men and more laid back demeanor serve as useful contrasts to Kayoko.

Yuko Tanabe another worker at the bookstore, Yuko is a plain looking girl who Kayoko is angered by when she finds out that Yuko has a boyfriend.  Kayoko jealously seduces Yuko's boyfriend and has sex with him in a car but is then disappointed to find out that he is not, in fact, in love with her.

Tokiedo a hip DJ that Kayoko meets in a club, Toki is the most significant crush that Kayoko has in volume 1.  After things do not work out with him, Kayoko temporarily renounces boys and focuses on work.

Sakai Sakai is the son of a cult leader who Kayoko meets in her hometown when visiting her mother to borrow money.  He stalks her after her interest in him wanes leading to his kidnap and near-rape of her, before Takahashi saves her.

Violet Violet is an attractive girl who is a student with Takahashi. When Kayoko sees that Violet is interested in Takahashi, she too realizes his worth as a suitor and gets together with him.

Goro Kishiwada Kishiwada is another of Kayoko's lovers.  An accomplished pottery artist, Kishiwada is the reason that Kayoko takes a job as an apprentice to a pottery teacher.

Miss Midori A rumored nymphomaniac, Miss Midori is Kishiwada's lover, and runs away with him towards the end of volume 3.

Reception 
The manga sold 3 million copies by November 2005.

TV adaptation

A 12-episode TV series based on the manga under the same title was directed by Kinoshita (木下高男) and Hirano (平野眞). Starring Fujiwara Norika (藤原紀香), it was first aired from 8 July to 23 September 1998. The theme song was Paradise by Southern All Stars.

References

External links
Official page on Tokyopop's web site
 
"Shojo manga pick of the month" -(J-pop.com)

Josei manga
1996 manga
Tokyopop titles
Shodensha manga
Moyoco Anno
Romance anime and manga